Ellert en Brammert is an open-air museum in Schoonoord expositing the way people lived in Drenthe at the time of the peat digging. It was named after a myth about the two giants Ellert and Brammert who prowled around the Ellertsveld.

References

External links 
 Ellert en Brammert, official website of the museum

Coevorden
Museums in Drenthe
Open-air museums in the Netherlands